Ipi Tombi (also produced as Ipi N'tombi, both corrupted transliterations of the Zulu iphi ntombi, or "where is the girl?"), is a 1974 musical by South African writers Bertha Egnos Godfrey and her daughter Gail Lakier, telling the story of a young black man leaving his village and young wife to work in the mines of Johannesburg. The show, originally called The Warrior, uses pastiches of a variety of South African indigenous musical styles.

Productions
The show, which starred Margaret Singana, enjoyed major success in South Africa and Nigeria, and toured Europe, the United States, Canada and Australia to critical acclaim. It played in the West End at Her Majesty's Theatre and on Broadway at the Harkness Theatre. The latter production attracted protests from groups who believed that the show gave a false impression of life in South Africa. That was the last production ever at the Harkness Theatre before it closed and was demolished.

Awards and nominations

Original London production

References

External links

1974 musicals
West End musicals
South African musicals